Kenneth Allen Jernstedt (July 20, 1917 – February 5, 2013) was an American Flying Tigers fighter pilot, a test pilot, a politician and a businessman.

Early life
Jernstedt was born in Yamhill County, Oregon, to Fred and Mae Jernstedt, and grew up on a farm in Carlton. He graduated from Yamhill High School in 1935 and from Linfield College in McMinnville, Oregon, in January 1939.

Flying career
After graduation, he enlisted in the United States Marine Air Corps. He earned his pilot wings in 1941 at Pensacola, Florida, and was assigned to Quantico.

In 1941, Jernstedt was recruited to join the Flying Tigers to fight the Japanese in China, resigning his Marine Corps commission (with the secret approval of the US government). He became a flight leader of the 3rd Squadron, flying the Curtiss P-40. On one mission, he and fellow flight leader William Norman Reed strafed two airfields and were credited with destroying 15 enemy aircraft on the ground; they split the bonus of $7,500 ($500 per aircraft). In his Flying Tigers career, Jernstedt was credited with an additional three victories, for a total of 10.5. In a 1999 interview, he stated that the figure should have been 12.5, but two could not be confirmed. Because he was ill, he received permission to leave the Flying Tigers several weeks before the unit was disbanded in early July 1942 (after the United States had entered the war).

Returning to the United States, he joined Republic Aviation as a civilian test pilot. Among the aircraft he flew was the P-47 Thunderbolt.

Post-war life and death
After the war ended, he moved to Hood River, Oregon, in 1946. He bought the Hood River Bottling Works, a soft drink bottler that he ran for 25 years.

He also entered politics, serving first as mayor of Hood River from 1959 to 1960. He was then elected to the Oregon State Legislature for one term in 1966 and the first of five terms in the Oregon State Senate in 1968. Following his last term as senator, he was again elected mayor of Hood River, from 1989 to 1990.

He married college sweetheart Laura Elliott in 1942; they had a son and three daughters. After her death in 1960, he married Genevieve Weder Carl in 1962, adopting her son and two daughters. Gen was a politician as well, and supported her husband's work, serving as his legislative aide.

Ken Jernstedt died on February 5, 2013, at the age of 95.

Honors
The main entrance gate to the Portland Air National Guard Base was named the Jernstedt Gate in 1981.

In 1996, Jernstedt and the other surviving Flying Tigers pilots were belatedly awarded the Distinguished Flying Cross.

Hood River's public airfield was renamed Ken Jernstedt Airfield on September 6, 2001.

Jernstedt was one of the nine inaugural inductees in the Oregon Aviation Hall of Fame in 2003; he was also inducted into the Oregon Aviation Hall of Honor in the same year.

In 2010, Oregon Department of Veterans' Affairs public affairs officer Mike Allegre, who grew up with Jernstedt's children, wrote of him in the state-published book 150 Years of Oregon Veterans.

References

External links
Flying Tigers AVG entry for Jernstedt

1917 births
2013 deaths
American test pilots
Aviators from Oregon
Businesspeople from Oregon
Flying Tigers
Members of the Oregon House of Representatives
Oregon state senators
People from Carlton, Oregon
United States Marine Corps officers
Linfield University alumni
20th-century American businesspeople
Military personnel from Oregon